Chía) is a municipality in Aragon in the province of Huesca, with an area of 25.95 km² and a population of 86 inhabitants (2018).

References

External links
View from Wikimapia

Municipalities in the Province of Huesca